The girls' cross-country cross freestyle cross-country skiing competition at the 2020 Winter Youth Olympics was held on 18 January at the Vallée de Joux Cross-Country Centre.

Results

Qualifying
The qualifying was held at 11:00.

Semifinals
Semifinal 1

Semifinal 2

Semifinal 3

Final
The final was held at 13:42.

References

Girls' cross-country cross